Acacia curranii, also known as curly-bark wattle, is a shrub belonging to the genus Acacia and the subgenus Juliflorae that is native to north eastern Australia. It is listed as vulnerable under the Environment Protection and Biodiversity Conservation Act 1999.

Description
It has grey to maroon coloured minni ritchi style bark. The sub-glabrous or silky haired branchlets are angular towards the apices and a maroon-grey colour with young shoots that have fine yellow hairs close to the stem. Like most species of Acacia it has phyllodes rather than true leaves. It blooms between August and September producing golden flowers. After flowering firmly chartaceous seed pods form that are flat and have a linear shape with reasonably straight sides but slightly constricted between seeds.

Distribution
It has a disjunct distribution and is endemic to parts of south eastern Queensland in the Darling Downs are around Gurulmundi growing in poorly drained sandy soils overlying sandstone in the north and also is found on the western plains of New South Wales where it is found on igneous hill growing in skeletal soils. In New South Wales it is found around Lake Cargelligo and the Gunderbooka Range. The three areas it is found in are separated by several hundred kilometres. Within these areas there are approximately twenty populations of the species found in around from ten broad localities continuing a total of fewer than 5,000 individual plants.

See also
List of Acacia species

References

curranii
Flora of Queensland
Taxa named by Joseph Maiden
Plants described in 1917
Flora of New South Wales